Karawa (Bulawa) is a language spoken in Sandaun Province, Papua New Guinea, by decreasing number of people. Speakers are shifting to Pouye, which is closely related (67% similar lexically). It is spoken in the single village of Pulwa (Bulawa) in East Wapei Rural LLG, Sandaun Province.

References

Languages of Sandaun Province
Endangered Papuan languages
Ram languages